Kobieta na krańcu świata (Woman At the End Of the World) is a Polish documentary television series broadcast on TVN. The programme is presented by Martyna Wojciechowska who visits interesting places all over the world and shows the everyday life of women living there. It premiered on 20 September 2009.

List of episodes

Series 1 (2009)

Series 2 (2010)

Series 3 (2011)

Series 4 (2012)

Series 5 (2013)

Series 6 (2014)

Series 7 (2015)

Series 8 (2016)

Series 9 (2017)

Series 10 (2018)

Series 11 (2019)

Series 12 (2020)

International broadcast

References 

2000s Polish television series
2010s Polish television series
2020s Polish television series
Polish documentary television series
2009 Polish television series debuts
TVN (Polish TV channel) original programming